Disodium helide (Na2He) is a compound of helium and sodium that is stable at high pressures above . It was first predicted using the USPEX crystal structure prediction algorithm and then synthesised in 2016.

Synthesis 
Na2He was predicted to be thermodynamically stable over 160 GPa and dynamically stable over 100 GPa. This means it should be possible to form at the higher pressure and then decompress to 100 GPa, but below that it would decompose. Compared with other binary compounds of other elements and helium, it was predicted to be stable at the lowest pressure of any such combination. This also means, for example, that a helium-potassium compound is predicted to require much higher pressures of the order of terapascals.

The material was synthesized by putting tiny plates of sodium in a diamond anvil cell along with helium at 1600 bar and then compressing to 130 GPa and heating to 1,500 K with a laser. Disodium helide is predicted to be an insulator and transparent. At 200 GPa the sodium atoms have a Bader charge of +0.599, the helium charge is −0.174, and the two-electron spots are each near −0.511. This phase could be called disodium helium electride. Disodium helide melts at a high temperature near 1,500 K, much higher than the melting point of sodium. When decompressed, it can keep its form as low as 113 GPa. As pressure increases, the sodium is predicted to gain more positive charge, the helium to lose negative charge and the free electron density to increase. Energy is compensated by the relative shrinking of the helium atoms and the space for electrons.

Structure 
Disodium helide has a cubic crystal structure, resembling that of fluorite. At 300 GPa the edge of a unit cell of the crystal has . Each unit cell contains four helium atoms on the centre of the cube faces and corners, and eight sodium atoms at coordinates halfway between the center and each corner. Double electrons (2e−) are positioned on each edge and the centre of the unit cell. Each pair of electrons is spin paired. The presence of these isolated electrons makes this an electride. The helium atoms do not participate in any bonding; however, the electron pairs can be considered as an eight-centre two-electron bond.

Footnotes

References

Sodium compounds
Helium compounds
Binary compounds
Substances discovered in the 2010s
Electrides